Nicholas County Bank is a historic bank building located at Summersville, Nicholas County, West Virginia.  It was built in 1923, and is a two-story, locally quarried sandstone building in the Classical Revival style. It has a rectangular plan, a flat roof, and a one-story entrance portico with Doric order columns.

It was listed on the National Register of Historic Places in 2000.

References

Bank buildings on the National Register of Historic Places in West Virginia
Commercial buildings completed in 1923
Buildings and structures in Nicholas County, West Virginia
Neoclassical architecture in West Virginia
National Register of Historic Places in Nicholas County, West Virginia
Sandstone buildings in the United States